Baden Baden is a 2016 French-Belgian dramedy film written and directed by Rachel Lang.

Cast 
 Salomé Richard as Ana 
 Claude Gensac as Odette
 Swann Arlaud as Simon
 Zabou Breitman as Chantale
 Olivier Chantreau as Boris
 Lazare Gousseau as Grégoire
 Jorijn Vriesendorp as Mira
 Driss Ramdi as Amar
 Noémie Rosset as Meriem 
 Thomas Silberstein as Samson
 Sam Louwyck as Andrew
 Kate Moran as Lois
 Kris Portier de Bellair as Boris's mother
 Régis Lang as Ana's father

Critical response
On review aggregator website Rotten Tomatoes, Baden Baden has an approval rating of 94%, based on 18 reviews, with an average rating of 6.9/10.

References

External links 
 

2016 films
2016 comedy-drama films
2010s French-language films
French comedy-drama films
Belgian comedy-drama films
2016 directorial debut films
French-language Belgian films
2010s French films